Agustí Montal i Costa (5 April 1934 in Barcelona, – 22 March 2017 in Barcelona) was a Spanish economist and businessman who was born in Barcelona, son of Agustí Montal Galobart. He was a member of an important family of Catalan cotton textile manufacturers. In 1969, he was elected president of FC Barcelona, a post he held until 1977.

During his tenure he promoted the slogan Mes que un club (More than a club). He introduced after the Spanish Civil War the Catalan club's newsletter, the membership card, and the stadium PA system. He often protested against the Spanish Football Federation for the discrimination suffered by the club by the arbitrators often to your detriment (as the case of Emilio Guruceta)

Netherlands striker joined Johann Cruyff and other famous international players such as Johan Neeskens or Hugo Sotil, which reached to win the league in 1973–1974, after fourteen years of not winning anything.

Also adopted the current club anthem, written by Jaume Picas and Josep Maria Espinàs.

In 1977, he resigned after his vice interinatge Raimon Carrasco, in the elections of 1978 he was elected club president Josep Lluís Núñez. He was also President of the Association of cotton textile manufacturers between 1979 and 1985. In 2003, he was elected President of the Catalan Encyclopedia Group. In 2004, the Catalan government gave him the Creu de Sant Jordi.

Trophies won by club during Agustí Montal Costa presidency
La Liga (1):
1973-74
Copa del Rey (1):
1970-71

References

Costa on FCB.com

1934 births
2017 deaths
Businesspeople from Catalonia
Spanish sports executives and administrators
People from Barcelona